Jim Eno (born February 8, 1966) is the drummer and one of the founding members of the Austin, Texas band Spoon.  He is also a record producer and a semiconductor chip designer.

Overview

Eno was born in Rhode Island. He studied electrical engineering at North Carolina State University and worked as a hardware design engineer at Compaq Computer Corporation in Houston before moving to Austin in 1992 to design microchips for Motorola. Since joining Spoon he has also worked for Metta Technology as an electrical engineer, but has worked entirely in music since mid-2006.

Eno met the lead singer of Spoon, Britt Daniel, when replacing the drummer of Daniel's former band The Alien Beats.  He owns and operates a studio called Public Hi-Fi in Austin, Texas, where the band has often recorded.  He has co-produced albums for Spoon and has produced albums for other bands, including !!!, Heartless Bastards, The Relatives and The Strange Boys (discography below).  Eno is also an accomplished engineer, working alongside producers Tony Visconti and Steve Berlin. He recently produced two songs for the solo debut of former Voxtrot frontman, Ramesh Srivastava, and mixed all three of the "EP 1" songs.

Starting at the Austin City Limits Festival in 2012 and continuing with SXSW 2013, 2014 and 2015, Jim Eno has been curating exclusive sessions for Spotify.  Artists featured include: The Shins, Palma Violets, Father John Misty, The 1975, Phantogram, Poliça, Jagwar Ma, The Hold Steady, Rag'n'Bone Man and more.

He was ranked 31st in Stylus magazine's list of fifty greatest rock drummers.

Selected discography as Producer, Engineer, Mixer

References

1966 births
Living people
20th-century American drummers
American male drummers
Spoon (band) members
20th-century American male musicians